2003 in Korea may refer to:
2003 in North Korea
2003 in South Korea